The women's 4 × 200 metre freestyle relay competition at the 1999 Pan Pacific Swimming Championships took place on August 26 at the Sydney International Aquatic Centre.  The last champion was the United States.

This race consisted of sixteen lengths of the pool. Each of the four swimmers completed four lengths of the pool. The first swimmer had to touch the wall before the second could leave the starting block.

Records
Prior to this competition, the existing world and Pan Pacific records were as follows:

Results
All times are in minutes and seconds.

Heats
Heats weren't performed, as only six teams had entered.

Final 
The final was held on August 22.

References

4 × 100 metre freestyle relay
1999 Pan Pacific Swimming Championships
1999 in women's swimming